"Private Landing" is a song by American rapper Don Toliver featuring Canadian singer Justin Bieber and fellow American rapper Future, released on February 24, 2023 as a track from the former's third studio album Love Sick. Written alongside producers Cardo, Omar Guetfa, Rob Bisel, and 206derek, it was released to rhythmic radio in the United States as the album's fourth single on March 14, 2023.

Composition
The song begins with Don Toliver performing the chorus and first verse, with lyrics about "poppin' at the Ritz" and being in bed with a "super soaker". He is followed by Future's verse, while Justin Bieber performs the bridge and last verse.

Critical reception
Clayton Purdom of Rolling Stone regarded the song as a track from Love Sick that "follow[s] the template perfectly". Hayley Hynes of HotNewHipHop praised Justin Bieber's feature, writing, "For Bieber's part, he mostly shows off his coveted vocal skills on the bridge with Toliver before reminding listeners that he's got some rap skills in his arsenal as well."

Visualizer
A visualizer of the song was released alongside Love Sick. It sees a special package being delivered to a restaurant where a beautiful woman is putting away stacks of cash, with two armed guards standing by, while the chef is cooking.

Charts

References

2023 songs
2023 singles
Don Toliver songs
Justin Bieber songs
Future (rapper) songs
Songs written by Don Toliver
Songs written by Justin Bieber
Songs written by Future (rapper)
Songs written by Cardo (record producer)
Song recordings produced by Cardo (record producer)
Cactus Jack Records singles
Atlantic Records singles